Rob Van Beek (born August 18, 1983) is a professional indoor lacrosse player. He attended St. Vincent College. He is from Port Coquitlam, British Columbia.

NLL career 
Van Beek was selected with the fifth overall pick in the First Round of the 2004 NLL Entry Draft by the Philadelphia Wings.

After missing much of the 2005 after tearing his right PCL, Van Beek led the entire NLL in penalty minutes during the 2006 season.
November 2009 Van Beek was traded to Calgary Roughnecks.

He is a frequent guest on the Preston and Steve morning radio show on 93.3 FM WMMR in Philadelphia to discuss the Philadelphia Wings. He is also a very keen artist and is of Dutch heritage.

in Spring of 2009 Van Beek was a voluntary assistant lacrosse coach for the Potsdam State Bears.
Fall Spring of 2009-10 Van Beek was a coach of Langley Thunder U14 Field Lacrosse Team.

BCLA / WLA Career
Van Beek was named league MVP and was also named to the All-Star team in 2003 and 2004 while playing Jr. A lacrosse in the British Columbia Lacrosse Association with the Port Coquitlam Saints. He was selected 1st overall in 2004 Western Lacrosse Association draft by the Langley Thunder.

2008 Van Beek Played for St Regis Indians of OLA Major Lacrosse Series.

2009 Van Beek Played for Langley Thunder of WLA placed on WLA 2nd All-Star Team

While playing for the Langley Thunder on August 27, 2011, the team won the Western Lacrosse Association Championship for the first time in franchise history. Van Beek is expected to play in the national Mann Cup that will be held in September 2011 at the Langley Events Centre.

Statistics

NLL

External links 
 Rob Van Beek prized pick at WLA draft

1983 births
Living people
Canadian lacrosse players
People from Port Coquitlam
Philadelphia Wings players
Sportspeople from British Columbia